Danbulla is a locality in the Tablelands Region, Queensland, Australia.

Geography 
Danbulla is bounded on the west by Lake Tinaroo. Most of the locality is a protected area except for a small part of the south-east of the locality. The protected areas include Danbulla National Park, Danbulla State Forest, Danbulla South Forest Reserve, Gadgarra National Park and Gadgarra Forest Reserve.

History 
Lake Euramoo State School opened on 19 May 1924 and closed on 31 December 1958.

References 

Tablelands Region
Localities in Queensland